This is a list of the Sites of Special Scientific Interest (SSSIs) in the Conwy Area of Search (AoS).

Sites

References 

Conwy
Conwy